George Anastaplo (November 7, 1925 – February 14, 2014) was a professor at Loyola University Chicago School of Law and author who was famously denied admission for many years to the Illinois Bar.  The denial of his admission became a Supreme Court case, In re Anastaplo, in which he insisted that the First Amendment of the U.S. Constitution protects the privacy of political affiliations; in particular, he refused to answer questions about membership in the Communist Party.  Anastaplo's stand was based on Constitutional principles and consequent rejection of McCarthyism, and nobody alleged that he had membership in the Communist Party. The Supreme Court's majority upheld the lower courts' ruling in favor of the Illinois Bar, although Justice Hugo Black dissented. After his Supreme Court case and denial of admission to the Bar, Anastaplo supported his family by teaching at the University of Chicago and other universities and colleges. He wrote many articles and books on philosophy, many of which acknowledged the influence of his teacher, Leo Strauss.

Early life

The son of Greek immigrants, Anastaplo served in the United States Army Air Corps during World War II as a navigator of B-17s and B-29s.  After the war he attended the University of Chicago where he earned his B.A. in 1948 and his J.D. in 1951. Even while a law student, Anastaplo attended the lectures and seminars of Leo Strauss.

Illinois Bar Exam

After he had passed the Bar Exam, Anastaplo was asked a series of questions typical during the age of the Red Scare.  He was asked whether members of the Communist Party should be allowed to enter the Bar and so be able to practice law, to which he replied yes.  This prompted a series of questions where the interviewers asked him about the nature of Communism in America to which he retorted that political dissent and even the right of revolution were part of the American constitutional heritage. When asked whether he was a Communist, Anastaplo replied that freedom of association was guaranteed by the first amendment, and that it was improper for the Bar to ask about political affiliations of applicants.

He continued to refuse to answer the question and eventually sued the Bar association, after which he promptly was counter-sued.  Almost a decade later the case reached the Supreme Court. In 1961 Professor Leo Strauss bolstered Anastaplo's spirits when he was petitioning for admission to the Illinois Bar by writing the two-sentence letter: "This is only to pay you my respects for your brave and just action. If the American Bench and Bar have any sense of shame they must come on their knees to apologize to you."

Supreme Court

Anastaplo argued the case himself before the U.S. Supreme Court, losing the case but being praised in the dissent by Justice Hugo Black.

Justice Black's dissent In re Anastaplo  would "immortalize Anastaplo", said Justice Brennan upon reading it. Black's dissent was read at Black's funeral, by his instructions.

Aftermath

Although he had lost the case, he became a figure of American liberty everywhere.  He was described as the 'Socrates of Chicago'. He spoke all around the country about the importance of liberties.  He taught liberal arts courses for nearly sixty years at the University of Chicago's Graham School of Continuing Liberal and Professional Studies. He also taught at Rosary College and the University of Dallas. He eventually became a professor at  Loyola University Chicago School of Law.  He also authored a number of books that outline his experience and the impact of it.

Death
Anastaplo, a resident of Hyde Park, Chicago, died February 14, 2014, of prostate cancer. He was survived by his wife of 65 years, Sara Jacqueline Prince Anastaplo, four children (Helen Scharbach Newlin (née Helen Margaret Anastaplo), George Malcolm Davidson Anastaplo, Miriam Irene Redleaf (née Sara Maria Anastaplo), and Theodora McShan Anastaplo), and eight grandchildren.

Books

The Bible: Respectful Readings (Lexington Books, 2008)
Reflections on Freedom of Speech and the First Amendment (University Press of Kentucky, 2007)
Plato's Meno: Translation and Commentary (Focus Publishing, 2006)
The Constitutionalist: Notes on the First Amendment (Lexington Books, 2005)
On Trial: From Adam & Eve to O.J. Simpson (Lexington Books, 2004)
But Not Philosophy: Seven Introductions to Non-Western Thought (Lexington Books, 2002)
Abraham Lincoln: A Constitutional Biography (Rowmen & Littlefield, 1999)
Liberty, Equality & Modern Constitutionalism: A Source Book (Focus Publ., 1999)
Campus Hate-Speech Codes, Natural Right, and Twentieth Century Atrocities (Edwin Mellen Press, 1999)
Campus Hate-Speech Codes and Twentieth Century Atrocities (Edwin Mellen Press, 1997)
The Thinker as Artist: From Homer to Plato & Aristotle (Ohio University Press, 1997)
The Amendments to the Constitution: A Commentary (Johns Hopkins University Press, 1995)
The American Moralist: On Law, Ethics and Government (Swallow Press/Ohio University Press, 1992)
The Constitution of 1787: A Commentary (Johns Hopkins University Press, 1989)
The Artist As Thinker: From Shakespeare to Joyce (Ohio University Press, 1983)
Human Being and Citizen: Essays on Virtue, Freedom, and the Common Good (Swallow Press, 1975)

See also
Ronald Collins & Sam Chaltain, We Must not be Afraid to be Free: Stories of Free Expression in America 4-16 (Oxford University Press, 2011) (account of GA and his case)
 Leo Strauss's students, about whom Anastaplo has written essays:
Allan Bloom
 Harry Jaffa
Sidney Hook,  Philosopher who corresponded with Anastaplo on due process and Communists

References

External links
 Blog of George Anastaplo: Contains many documents and links to numerous writings.
 Anastaplo's official webpage at Loyola University's School of Law
 In re Anastaplo (Wikisource)
 Dissent by Hugo Black (Wikisource)
 Transcripts and audio of oral arguments

1925 births
2014 deaths
United States Free Speech Clause case law
Free speech activists
Victims of McCarthyism
American political philosophers
 
University of Chicago Law School alumni
University of Chicago faculty
University of Chicago alumni
Lawyers from Chicago
Political scientists who studied under Leo Strauss
American people of Greek descent
People from St. Louis
United States Army Air Forces pilots of World War II
Dominican University (Illinois) faculty
American navigators
Historians from Illinois